Baćović (Cyrillic script: Баћовић) is a Serbo-Croatian surname. Notable people with the surname include:

 Petar Baćović (1898–1945), Bosnian Serb Chetnik leader
 Simo Baćović (1828–1911), Montenegrin voivode
 Vasilije Baćović

Serbian surnames
Montenegrin surnames